The Easy Way to Stop Smoking is a self-help book written by British author and accountant Allen Carr first published in 1985. The book aims to help people quit smoking, offering a range of different methods. Although championed by many celebrities, there has been limited empirical study of Carr's method.

Background
After 30 years of heavy smoking, Carr quit in 1983, at the age of 48. He subsequently left his job as an accountant in the same year and opened the first "easiest way" clinic, to help other addicts. Carr wrote a number of books intended to lead to smoking cessation and loss of excess weight, some of which were best sellers.

Carr writes that smoking addiction is psychological and therefore this is the most significant factor in addiction to cigarettes. The book is divided into 44 chapters, whose purpose is to lead the smoker to, upon completion of reading the book, make the decision to quit smoking.

Clinical trial
A 2018 study funded by DOH Ireland set out with an objective to determine if Allen Carr's Easyway to Stop Smoking was superior to Quit.ie in a randomised clinical trial. Quit.ie is an online portal for smoking cessation. The Allen Carr method was implemented in group sessions. The trial consisted of 300 adults and concluded that Allen Carr's method was superior to Quit.ie. This was the first clinical trial of Carr's method.

Criticism
Pneumologist and tobacco addiction expert Bertrand Dautzenberg does not consider Allen Carr's Easyway to deal with evidence-based techniques. Dautzenberg's opinion is that while coaching methods are acceptable, Carr's book dismisses nicotine physical dependence and opposes substitution treatment; he concludes that doctors should advise against Allen Carr's Easyway method. Dautzenberg's own critics have noted that Dautzenberg's daily practice and interest is in the study of addiction and not in possible cures for addiction.

References list

External links

1985 non-fiction books
Self-help books
Smoking cessation
Bibliotherapy books